The Dobrynin VD-4K was a Soviet six-bank, 24-cylinder, turbo-compound, inline engine developed after the end of World War II. It was superseded by turboprop engines before it could be widely used.

Development
The VD-4K, originally designated as the M-253K, was a development of the post-war VD-3TK (M-251K) engine. Like Nazi Germany's experimental Junkers Jumo 222 multibank wartime engine, the VD-4K had six monobloc banks, each with four liquid-cooled cylinders. However, the VD-4K had a larger displacement figure — at nearly 59.5 litres — than any planned or tested development of the German powerplant; itself only planned to have a top displacement figure of 55.5 litres, with a 145 x 140 mm bore-stroke figure for each cylinder in its planned 222C/D version. The VD-4K utilized a trio of blow-down exhaust, also known as power-recovery, turbines were fitted between the cylinder banks, and a geared centrifugal supercharger and a turbocharger were fitted to the engine itself, which made the VD-4K a turbo-compound engine.

Development began in January 1949 and construction of the prototype began in September of that year. The first engine was completed in January 1950 and it underwent its 100-hour tests in June. It successfully passed its State acceptance tests in January–February 1951. It was evaluated aboard a Tupolev Tu-4 bomber in 1950, itself powered with a quartet of the Shvetsov OKB's 1946-origin, ASh-73 radial engines, each of a displacement figure of 58.1 litres, somewhat close to that of the Dobrynin multibank powerplant design. The Dobrynin engines were most notably fitted to the two prototypes of the Tupolev Tu-85 bomber, but the aircraft, and its engines, was not placed into production because of the promise offered by turboprop engines of immensely more power, like the Kuznetsov NK-12 — itself developed and in test by 1951 — and used on the Tupolev Tu-95 strategic bomber

Applications
Tupolev Tu-4
Tupolev Tu-85

Specifications (VD-4K)

See also

References

Notes

Bibliography

External links
 VD-4 
  Dobrynin Museum, including picture of a restored VD-4 

1950s aircraft piston engines
Inline radial engines
Water-cooled radial engines